Hatgad Fort  is a fort located from Nashik, Nashik district, of Maharashtra. The base village is Hatgad on the Nashik-Saputara Road. The nearest town is Saputara, which is 6 km from Hatgad village. It is a historic monument located in Maharashtra, India, south of the hill station of Saputara and near the border with Gujarat. It was built by the Maratha king Shivaji and is located at an elevation of about 3,600 feet. The way to reach the fort is through a trekking route via a narrow rocky path and car also go up to the stairs of fort. A statue of Lord Shivling is placed on the top of the fort.

History
In 1547 King Bhairavsen, son of King Mahadevsen of the Bagul dynasty, defeated the Burhan Nizam shah of Ahmednagar and captured the fort. The Rangarav Aundhekar was the last Peshwa officer who held the fort. The fort was captured by Captain Briggs of East India Company  in 1818.

Places to see
There are four  gates in a row on the main entrance path of the fort. The main entrance gate has a Hanuman idol carved in rock. There is a two rock cut water cisterns called Ganga and Jamuna on the fort plateau. The water is available round the year. There is an inscription in Sanskrit carved on the rock near the cistern. There are few building structures on the fort which are now in ruined state except got the ammunition store building which is in good condition.

See also 
 List of forts in Maharashtra
 List of forts in India
 Marathi People
 Maratha Navy
 List of Maratha dynasties and states

References 

 Gujrat State Book

Buildings and structures of the Maratha Empire
Forts in Nashik district
16th-century forts in India
Tourist attractions in Nashik district
Indian rock-cut architecture
Former populated places in India